Konter may refer to:

People
François Konter (1934–2018), Luxembourgian football player
Lucien Konter (1925–1990), Luxembourgian footballer
Richard W. Konter (1882–1979), radioman in the U.S. Navy

Others
Konter a Matt, Luxembourgish card game
Konter Cliffs, line of cliffs in Marie Byrd Land, Antarctica

See also
Kanter, surname